Chronoxenus dalyi is a species of ant of the genus Chronoxenus. It was described by Forel in 1895. The ant is endemic to Bangladesh, India, Nepal and China.

References

Dolichoderinae
Insects of Bangladesh
Insects of India
Insects of Nepal
Insects of China
Insects described in 1895